Phorodon is a genus of true bugs belonging to the family Aphididae.

The species of this genus are found in Europe and Northern America.

Species:
 Phorodon cannabis Passerini, 1860 
 Phorodon humuli (Schrank, 1801)

References

Aphididae